HMS M31 was an M29-class monitor of the Royal Navy.

The availability of ten 6 inch Mk XII guns from the Queen Elizabeth-class battleships in 1915 prompted the Admiralty to order five scaled down versions of the M15-class monitors, which had been designed to utilise 9.2 inch guns.  HMS M31 and her sisters were ordered from Harland & Wolff, Belfast in March 1915.  Launched on 24 June 1915, she was completed in July 1915.  Upon completion, HMS M31 was sent to the Mediterranean, and remained there until March, 1919.

In 1916, she defended the port city of Yanbo, in Saudi Arabia, against the Turkish army by providing artillery cover for the Arab rebels.  She served from May to September 1919 in support of British and White Russian forces in the White Sea, before returning to England.

In September 1923, HMS M31 was taken in hand for conversion to a minelayer.  Equipped to carry 52 mines, she was renamed HMS Melpomene in December 1925.  She was assigned to HMS Defiance the Torpedo School at Devonport. In September, 1939 she was converted to a torpedo training vessel, fitted with one 21 inch torpedo tube on the forecastle.

She was renamed HMS Menelaus in 1941, and was finally sold in 1948 and broken up at Llanelly.

References 

 
 Young, John. A Dictionary of Ships of the Royal Navy of the Second World War. Patrick Stephens Ltd, Cambridge, 1975. 
 Lenton, H.T. & Colledge, J. J. Warships of World War II, Ian Allan, London, 1973. 
 Dittmar, F. J. & Colledge, J. J., "British Warships 1914-1919", (Ian Allan, London, 1972), 
 Gray, Randal (ed), "Conway's All the World's Fighting Ships 1906–1921", (Conway Maritime Press, London, 1985),  
 Lawrence, T. E., Revolt in the Desert, George H. Doran Company, 1927.

 

M29-class monitors
Ships built in Belfast
1915 ships
World War I monitors of the United Kingdom
Royal Navy ship names
Ships built by Harland and Wolff